Thomas Bolton Gilchrist Septimus Dalziel (1823–1906) was an English engraver known chiefly for his illustrations of the work of Charles Dickens.

Biography 

Thomas Dalziel was the youngest of The Brothers Dalziel, a prolific wood-engraving business in Victorian London, founded in 1839 by George Dalziel.

Thomas produced many illustrations for books published by the family firm. Many of his designs are considered by Philip Allingham (Faculty of Education, Lakehead University, Thunder Bay, Ontario) to be workmanlike rather than anything more inspired, although he considers Thomas Dalziel's illustrations for Bunyan's Pilgrim's Progress and The Arabian Nights to be above average.

In common with many of his siblings, he is buried on the western side of Highgate Cemetery.

References

Other sources

External links 

  
 Dalziel Brothers at LC Authorities, with catalogue records including some credited to particular siblings

1823 births
1906 deaths
Burials at Highgate Cemetery
19th-century engravers
20th-century engravers
British engravers
British illustrators
20th-century British printmakers
People from Wooler